The Wati languages are the dominant Pama–Nyungan languages of central Australia. They include the moribund Wanman language and the Western Desert dialect continuum, which is sometimes considered to be a dozen distinct languages.  It is not clear whether Antakarinya is Warnman or Western Desert (reference?).

Bowern (2011) adds Ngardi, which had previously been classified as Ngumpin–Yapa.

Wati is generally included in Southwest Pama–Nyungan by those who accept that proposal. However, SW Pama–Nyungan may be an areal group, and is not included in Bowern (2011).

References

 
Indigenous Australian languages in Western Australia
Indigenous Australian languages in South Australia
Indigenous Australian languages in the Northern Territory